Samuel Nchinda-Kaya (born 25 May 1967) is a former Cameroonian sprinter who competed in the men's 100m competition at the 1992 Summer Olympics. He recorded a 10.41, enough to qualify for the next round past the heats, where he scored a 10.58. His personal best is 10.24, set in 1992. He also ran in the 200m, clocking in at 21.50. In the 1988 Summer Olympics, he competed in the 100m and 200m as well, advancing to the semifinals in the latter.

References

1967 births
Living people
Cameroonian male sprinters
Athletes (track and field) at the 1988 Summer Olympics
Athletes (track and field) at the 1992 Summer Olympics
Olympic athletes of Cameroon
20th-century Cameroonian people